The Unbelievable (Chinese: 怪談; Gwai Tam) is a Hong Kong TV program about paranormal and other supernatural occurrences mostly in Hong Kong and nearby East Asia countries.  It is generally based on Eastern Buddhist, Taoist or Chinese spiritual supernatural perspective, though not limited to these philosophies.

Name
The Chinese name of the show, 怪談, literally means "Strange Talk" ('Gwaai3 Taam4' in Cantonese). The characters are also used for the Japanese word of Kaidan.

Format
Generally the format follows that of a reality show where live video taping is done in areas with paranormal activities or hauntings.  Sometimes re-enactments or experiments are done to explain a specific phenomenon or sightings.  At the end of the episodes, live call-ins allow home viewers to ask questions or inform others about their personal experiences.  Many guests, fans and specialists are invited to join the programming to provide expertise or participate.   The long term success of the show has expanded to fan clubs.

Host
 Generation 1: Simon Lui (雷宇揚)
 Generation 2: Si ming (施明)
 Generation 3: Si ming (施明), Emily Kwan (關寶慧), Nelson Cheung (張學潤) 
 Generation 4: Spencer Leung (梁思浩), Monique Au (歐綺霞)
 Generation 5: Spencer Leung (梁思浩), Kaki Leung(梁嘉琪)
 Generation 6: Spencer Leung (梁思浩), Sammie Yue (余思敏) and Rachel Chen (陳曉華).
 Generation 7: Sammie Yue (余思敏), Rachel Chen (陳曉華)
 Generation 8: Spencer Leung (梁思浩), Natalie Mitchell (可宜), Zoie Tam (譚凱琪),Cammi Tse (谢芷蕙), Nelson Cheung (張學潤), Josephine Shum (岑寶兒)
 Generation 9: Spencer Leung (梁思浩), Rain Lau Yuk Tsui (劉玉翠), Lukian Wang (王寶寶)
 Generation 10: Spencer Leung (梁思浩), Maggie Lee (李曼筠), Howard Chan (陳皓雲)

Topics
A very wide range of topics have been covered by the show. Below are some samples

 After death revisits
 Out of body experiences
 Eastern style exorcism
 Ghosts and relationships
 Hauntings
 Spiritual communications
 Bewitching
 Reincarnations
 Proper burial and funeral methods
 Tools and equipment analysis
 Practices, procedures

Film
Some hosts showed in similar film The Unbelievable (2009) some differences in its Hong Kong and Singapore/Malaysia versions.

References
 The Unbelievable show hosts for Generation 6

External links
 The Unbelievable forum

 The Unbelievable

Non-fiction television series
1990s Hong Kong television series